Robert Linklater (1893–1953) was a rugby league footballer in the  New South Wales Rugby League.

Linklater, a fullback,  played first grade with Eastern Suburbs in the 1915 season, and lower grades until 1919. He also played with South Sydney in 1923.

References

Australian rugby league players
Sydney Roosters players
Rugby league fullbacks
1893 births
1953 deaths
Place of birth missing
South Sydney Rabbitohs players